Shatru Gate (Nepali: शत्रु गते) is a 2018 Nepalese drama comedy film, directed by Pradip Bhattarai and written by Deepak Raj Giri, Pradeep Bhattari and Hari Bansha Acharya. The film is produced by Deepak Raj Giri, Deepa Shree Niraula, Narendra Kansakar and Shivahari Poudel under the banner of MaHa Sanchar. The film stars ensemble cast of Madan Krishna Shrestha, Hari Bansha Acharya, Deepak Raj Giri, Deepa Shree Niraula, Priyanka Karki, Paul Shah, Aanchal Sharma. The film was released on 23 March 2018 with mixed response from critics but positive response from audience. The film became an "All Time Blockbuster" at the box office with gross of over रु 12 Crore making it the fourth-highest-grossing Nepali film at 2018.

Plot 
Suraj (Paul Shah) and Sandhya (Aanchal Sharma) are deeply in love and are about to marry. Suraj's father (Hari Bansha Acharya) does not want his son to marry a corrupt politician's daughter. Both of their lives change forever after Rahul (Deepak Raj Giri) creates a conflict between their families.

Cast 
 Hari Bansha Acharya as Gopal Sharma
 Madan Krishna Shrestha as Colony Owner (extended cameo appearance)
 Deepak Raj Giri as Rahul KC
 Deepa Shree Niraula as Deepa Sharma
 Priyanka Karki as Shetal KC
 Paul Shah as Suraj Sharma
 Aanchal Sharma as Sandhya
 Ramesh Ranjan Jha as Sandhya's father
 Basundhara Bhusal as Sandhya's mother
 Kiran K.C. as Security Guard
 Shivahari Poudel as Consultancy Manpower
 Rajaram Poudel as Pandit Bajey
 Narendra Kansakar 
 Mohit Bamsha Acharya as Mahendra 
 Yaman Shrestha as Colonist

Reception

Box office 
The film debuted with 3.26 crore in its first weekend. The film earned 12.54 crore on its fourth weekend and became the fourth highest grossing Nepali film as of 2018.

Critical response 
Shashwat Pant of Onlinekhabar wrote, "Overall, the movie is disappointing. It felt like watching another sequel of Chakka Panja mainly because most of the members of the cast were same and everything was presented in a similar way." Anand Nepal of Xnepali wrote, "The movie is very entertaining, the actors have done a great job. The technical aspect of the movie is also very good."

Accolades

Soundtrack

References

External links 

 

2010s Nepali-language films
Nepalese comedy-drama films
2018 films
2018 comedy-drama films